Anne-Marie Krumpholtz (née Steckler) was a French harpist and composer.

Life
Anne-Marie Steckler was the daughter of Christian Steckler, an instrument maker frequented by harpist and composer Johann Baptist Krumpholtz in Metz, France. She studied harp with Krumpholtz and made her debut in 1779, playing in concert with him at the Concerts Spirituel in Paris. Steckler married Krumpholtz on the death of his first wife and they had three children, but she left France with pianist Jan Ladislav Dussek to live in London about 1788. However, Dussek left her for Sophia Corri in 1792.

Anne-Marie Krumpholtz was a leading soloist and founded a tradition of professional stage performance on harp for women.  Joseph Haydn wrote an aria accompaniment for her in his opera L’anima del filosofo: Orpheus & Eurydice. Her daughter Fanny Krumpholtz Pittar was also a harpist and composer.

Works
Selected works include:
Lison Dormoit
A Favorite Piemontois Air with Variations by Dalvimare
The Favorite Air of Pray Goody

References

External links
 

18th-century classical composers
19th-century classical composers
French classical harpists
French music educators
French classical composers
French women classical composers
19th-century French composers
18th-century French composers
Women music educators
19th-century women composers
18th-century women composers